HMS Aurora was an  light cruiser of the Royal Navy. She was built by Portsmouth Dockyard, with the keel being laid down on 27 July 1935. She was launched on 20 August 1936, and commissioned 12 November 1937.

History
Aurora served with the Home Fleet from completion as Rear Admiral (D). From October 1940 she was commanded by Captain William Gladstone Agnew. After the Norwegian Campaign she participated in the operations hunting the German battleship  and, with the cruiser , intercepted one of the German supply ships, Belchen, on 3 June 1941.

Between July and August 1941, as part of Force K with the Home Fleet, she was involved in operations to Spitzbergen and Bear Island (Operation Gauntlet). After one of these sorties, in company with the cruiser , she intercepted a German troop convoy off Northern Norway, and the German  was sunk. In the autumn she was transferred to the Mediterranean and arrived in Malta on 21 October 1941 to join a new Force K.

On 24 November Force K, made up of the British light cruisers Aurora and Penelope and the destroyers Lance and Lively, intercepted an Axis convoy about 100 nautical miles west of Crete. The Axis convoy was bound from the Aegean to Benghazi.
On 1 December 1941 Force K with HMS Penelope and HMS Lively attacked the Mantovani Convoy. The Italian destroyer Alvise Da Mosto and the sole cargo ship Mantovani were sunk.

HMS Aurora also participated in the First Battle of Sirte on 17 December 1941. On 19 December while steaming off Tripoli she was heavily damaged in a mine field and was forced to retire to Malta.

After her return to the Mediterranean she joined Force H, and in November was part of the Centre Task Force for the Landings in North Africa, Operation Torch. The following day she badly damaged the destroyer Épervier and drove her ashore. By December she was operating as part of Force Q at Bône against the Axis evacuation and supply convoys between Trapani and Tunis.

Then, as a unit of the 15th Cruiser Squadron, she participated in the invasion of Sicily and the Salerno landings (Operation Avalanche) before moving into the Aegean in October 1943. While escorting British destroyers reinforcing troops on the island of Leros on 30 October, she was attacked by German Junkers 87 and 88 aircraft off Castellorizo, sustaining a 500 kg bomb hit abaft the after funnel.  The explosion and subsequent fire killed 47 crew. Aurora was forced to withdraw to Taranto for repairs which lasted until April 1944. In August 1944 she was at the landings in the south of France, then returned to the Aegean, where she assisted in the liberation of Athens. One notable member of crew was the actor Kenneth More, who used his theatre skills in his role as 'action broadcaster' to describe to the crew below decks via the public address system what was happening when the ship was in action.

Chinese service

After the war Aurora was sold on 19 May 1948 to the Chinese Navy as compensation for six Chinese custom patrol ships and one cargo ship that the British seized in Hong Kong and lost during the war. She was renamed Chung King, after the Chinese war time capital of Chung King (Chongqing), and became the flagship of the Republic of China Navy. On 25 February 1949 her crew defected to the Communists with the ship. Her name in Chinese remained unchanged but the Communists romanised the name differently, as Tchoung King. In March 1949 she was sunk in Huludao harbour by Nationalist aircraft. She was later salvaged with Soviet assistance but then stripped bare as "repayment". The original engines were sent to the Shanghai Department of Electricity, and were replaced with engines from the scuttled coastal defence ship . The empty hulk spent the rest of her life as an accommodation and warehouse ship, being subsequently renamed Huang He (Yellow River) in 1959, when it was transferred to Shanghai on 27 October of that year to be converted to a salvage ship at a planned budget of 3 million ¥. After spending 276,000 ¥, the conversion project was cancelled, and the ship was once again transferred, this time to Tianjin in June 1965, used as a barracks ship and renamed Pei Ching. She was scrapped at some point during the Cultural Revolution. Her name tablet and ship's bell were preserved in the Military Museum of the Chinese People's Revolution.

Commanding officers
L. H. K. Hamilton
William Gladstone Agnew
Robert Sherbrooke
Deng Zhaoxiang

Footnotes

References

External links

HMS Aurora at Uboat.net

 

Arethusa-class cruisers (1934)
1936 ships
Ships built in Portsmouth
World War II cruisers of the United Kingdom
Cruisers of the Republic of China Navy
Cruisers of the People's Liberation Army Navy
Cruisers sunk by aircraft
Cross-Strait relations
Naval mutinies
Ships of the People's Liberation Army Navy
Chinese defectors